= Schoolhouse Hollow =

Valley in West Virginia, United States

Coordinates: 38°08′15″N 80°00′30″W

Schoolhouse Hollow (elevation: 2,408 feet (734 m)) is a valley in the U.S. state of West Virginia.

A schoolhouse once stood in the valley, hence the name.
